Stoermeriana is a genus of moths in the family Lasiocampidae described by Josef J. de Freina and Thomas Joseph Witt in 1983.

Species
Some species of this genus are:
Stoermeriana abbayensis Rougeot, 1984
Stoermeriana abyssinica (Aurivillius, 1909)
Stoermeriana aculeata (Walker, 1865)
Stoermeriana acuminata (Walker, 1865)
Stoermeriana amblycalymma (Tams, 1936)
Stoermeriana amphilecta (Tams, 1936)
Stoermeriana basale (Walker, 1855)
Stoermeriana callizona (Tams, 1931)
Stoermeriana camerunicum (Aurivillius, 1902)
Stoermeriana cervina (Aurivillius, 1927)
Stoermeriana chavalloni Rougeot, 1984
Stoermeriana coilotoma (Bethune-Baker, 1911)
Stoermeriana collenettei (Tams, 1931)
Stoermeriana congoense (Aurivillius, 1909)
Stoermeriana craterum (Tams, 1929)
Stoermeriana das (Hering, 1928)
Stoermeriana directa (Mabille, 1893)
Stoermeriana distinguenda (Aurivillius, 1905)
Stoermeriana eccrita (D. S. Fletcher, 1968)
Stoermeriana fuliginosa (Holland, 1893)
Stoermeriana fusca (Aurivillius, 1905)
Stoermeriana gamma (Aurivillius, 1909)
Stoermeriana graberii (Dewitz, 1881)
Stoermeriana laportei (Rougeot, 1977)
Stoermeriana livida (Holland, 1893)
Stoermeriana makomanum (Strand, 1912)
Stoermeriana mirabilis (Distant, 1897)
Stoermeriana muriniscolor Rougeot, 1984
Stoermeriana nabatea de Freina, 2003
Stoermeriana ocellata (Tams, 1929)
Stoermeriana oinopa (Tams, 1936)
Stoermeriana omana de Freina & Witt, 1988
Stoermeriana pachyla (Tams, 1936)
Stoermeriana pamphenges (Tams, 1936)
Stoermeriana pygmaeorum (Tams, 1929)
Stoermeriana regraguii (Rungs, 1950)
Stoermeriana saanayetae Rougeot, 1984
Stoermeriana singulare (Aurivillius, 1893)
Stoermeriana sjostedti (Aurivillius, 1902)
Stoermeriana sminthocara (Tams, 1936)
Stoermeriana superba (Aurivillius, 1909)
Stoermeriana tamsi (Rougeot, 1977)
Stoermeriana tessmanni (Strand, 1912)
Stoermeriana thomensis (Talbot, 1929)
Stoermeriana versicolora Kühne, 2008
Stoermeriana viettei (Rougeot, 1977)
Stoermeriana vinacea (Tams, 1929)

External links

Lasiocampidae